Spring training is the preseason in Major League Baseball (MLB), a series of practices and exhibition games preceding the start of the regular season. Spring training allows new players to try out for roster and position spots, and gives established players practice time prior to competitive play. Spring training has always attracted fan attention, drawing crowds who travel to the warm climates of Arizona and Florida to enjoy the weather and watch their favorite teams play.

In modern training, teams that train in Florida will play other Florida-training teams in their exhibition games, regardless of regular-season league affiliations. Likewise, Arizona-training teams will play other Arizona teams. These have been nicknamed the Grapefruit League and Cactus League, respectively, after plants typical of the respective states.

Spring training typically starts in mid-February and continues until just before Opening Day of the regular season, which falls in the last week of March. In some years, teams not scheduled to play on Opening Day will play spring training games that day. Pitchers and catchers report to spring training first because pitchers benefit from a longer training period. A few days later, position players arrive and team practice begins. Exhibition games usually begin in late February.

History
The New York Mutuals became perhaps the first baseball team to hold a spring training outside of their home when, in 1869, Boss Tweed sent the Mutuals south to New Orleans to prepare for the season. In the 1870s, several clubs began following the example set by the Mutuals by training in warmer climates. New Orleans was a popular location for spring training in the 19th century but teams also trained in Washington, D.C., Savannah, Georgia and Cape May, New Jersey among other locations. In 1888, the Washington Nationals became the first club to hold spring training in Florida. The practice was not universally adopted, however. Critics including Cap Anson argued that players would be more prone to sore muscles and colds after returning to their colder home climates.

Hot Springs, Arkansas

Spring training by major league teams in sites other than their regular season game sites first became popular in the 1890s and by 1910 was in wide use. Hot Springs, Arkansas, has been called the original "birthplace" of spring training baseball. The location of Hot Springs and the concept of getting the players ready for the upcoming season was the brainchild of Chicago White Stockings (today's Chicago Cubs) team President Albert Spalding and Cap Anson. In 1886, the White Stockings traveled to Hot Springs to prepare for the upcoming season. After holding spring training at the Hot Springs Baseball Grounds, the White Stockings went on to have a successful season and other teams took notice. In subsequent years other teams joined Chicago and began holding spring training in Hot Springs, leading to the first spring training games. The Cleveland Spiders, Detroit Tigers, Pittsburgh Pirates, Cincinnati Reds, Brooklyn Dodgers, and Boston Red Sox followed the White Stockings to Hot Springs. Whittington Field/Ban Johnson Park (1894), Majestic Park (1909), and Fogel Field (1912) were all built in Hot Springs to host Major League teams.

Famously, on St. Patrick's Day, 1918, a successful young pitcher for the Red Sox named Babe Ruth was forced to play an emergency game at first base in a spring training game against Pittsburgh. This game possibly changed the course of baseball history, as it was the first time Ruth had ever played any position other than pitcher. Ruth responded by hitting two home runs that day in Hot Springs, with the second being a 573-foot shot that landed across the street from Whittington Park in a pond of the Arkansas Alligator Farm and Petting Zoo. The Red Sox took notice and soon Ruth was playing the field more often. Over 130 Major League Baseball Hall of Famers, including Ruth, Anson, Cy Young, Honus Wagner, Ty Cobb, Tris Speaker, Walter Johnson, Rogers Hornsby, Mel Ott, Dizzy Dean, Jimmie Foxx, and Stan Musial, trained in Hot Springs. The First Boys of Spring is a 2015 documentary about Hot Springs Spring Training. The film was narrated by actor Billy Bob Thornton, an area native, and produced by filmmaker Larry Foley. The documentary began airing nationally on the MLB Network in February 2016.

Early training sites include the St. Louis Cardinals in Hot Springs and Tulsa, Oklahoma; the New York Yankees in New Orleans and later Phoenix, Arizona, when the team was owned by Del Webb; the Chicago Cubs in Los Angeles when owned by William Wrigley Jr.; the St. Louis Browns and later the Kansas City Athletics in San Diego and then in West Palm Beach, Florida; the Pittsburgh Pirates in Dawson Springs, Kentucky around 1915 and Honolulu, while other teams joined in by the early 1940s. The Detroit Tigers are credited with being the first team to conduct spring training camp in Arizona. They trained in Phoenix at Riverside Park at Central Avenue and the Salt River in 1929.

Founding of the Grapefruit League
The Philadelphia Phillies were the first of the current major-league teams to train in Florida, when they spent two weeks in Jacksonville, Florida in 1889. Spring training in Florida began in earnest in 1913, when the Chicago Cubs trained in Tampa and the Cleveland Indians in Pensacola. One year later, two other teams moved to Florida for spring training, the real start of the Grapefruit League. Except for a couple of years during World War II, when travel restrictions prevented teams training south of the Potomac and Ohio Rivers, Florida hosted more than half of the spring training teams through 2009. Since 2010, major league teams have been equally divided between Arizona and Florida during spring training, with 15 teams in Florida and 15 teams in Arizona. All but six of the major league teams have gone to spring training in Florida at one time or another. Many of the most famous players in baseball history (Ruth, Gehrig, Musial, Cobb, Mays, DiMaggio, Berra, Mantle, and many more) have called Florida home for 4–6 weeks every spring.

Founding of the Cactus League

According to the autobiography of former Cleveland Indians owner Bill Veeck, the avoidance of racism was one reason the Cactus League was established. In 1947, Veeck was the owner of the minor league Milwaukee Brewers and the team trained in Ocala, Florida. Veeck inadvertently sat in the Black section of the segregated stands and engaged in conversation with a couple of fans. According to Veeck's book, the local law enforcement told Veeck he could not sit in that section, and then called the Ocala mayor when Veeck argued back. The mayor finally backed down when Veeck threatened to take his team elsewhere for spring training and promised to let the country know why.

Veeck sold the Brewers in 1945 and temporarily retired to a ranch in Tucson, Arizona, but purchased the Cleveland Indians in 1946. Intending to introduce African-American players, Veeck decided to buck tradition and train the Indians in Tucson and convinced the New York Giants to give Phoenix a try. Thus the Cactus League was born. In 1947, Veeck signed Larry Doby to the Indians. Doby was the second African-American to play MLB in the 20th century, and the first in the American League.

By , the split was even, with 15 teams training in each location.

Other spring training sites
While Florida and Arizona now host all Major League Baseball teams for spring training, this has not always been the case. Especially in the early 20th century, baseball clubs did not build facilities dedicated to spring training and would use local facilities in various cities, sometimes changing spring training sites on an annual basis. The Cleveland Indians, for example, held spring trainings in seven different cities – including New Orleans, Dallas, and Macon, Georgia – between 1902 and 1922. This was not uncommon at the time.

The New York Giants likely built the first "permanent" spring training facility in Marlin, Texas. The Giants trained in Marlin from 1908 to 1918 and built Emerson Park and adjacent parks for spring training activities. The city of Marlin deeded the land to the ballclub.  

During World War II, most teams held an abbreviated spring training within easy reach of their cities. In order to conserve rail transport during the war, 1943's Spring Training was limited to an area east of the Mississippi River and north of the Ohio River. The Chicago White Sox held camp in French Lick, Indiana; the Washington Senators in College Park, Maryland; and the New York Yankees in Asbury Park, New Jersey.

After World War II, some teams trained outside of the United States. The Brooklyn Dodgers trained in Havana, Cuba in 1947 and 1949, and in the Dominican Republic in 1948. The New York Yankees also trained in the early 1950s in Cuba and the Dominican Republic. Spring training camps and games were also held in Hawaii, Puerto Rico, and various cities of northern Mexico, sometimes by visiting major league teams in the 1950s and 1960s.

Before and shortly after big league baseball reached the West Coast, a number of teams trained in the state of California or along the state line. The Chicago Cubs trained on Catalina Island in the 1920s, '30s, and '40s. For example, early in their history, the then-California Angels held spring training in Palm Springs, California from 1961 to 1993, the San Diego Padres in Yuma, Arizona from 1969 to 1993, the Oakland Athletics in Las Vegas, Nevada in the 1970s, and various major league teams had trained in El Centro, Riverside, and San Bernardino.

International spring training

The concept of spring training is not limited to North America; the Japanese professional baseball leagues' teams adopted spring training and preseason game sites across East Asia such as South Korea, the Philippines, and Taiwan; on the Pacific Islands (most notably in Hawaii); and in two cities in the United States: Salinas, California and Yuma, Arizona on the Mexican border.

In 2015, 2016 and 2019, MLB has hosted spring training games in Mexico. In 2015, the Arizona Diamondbacks played against the Colorado Rockies at Estadio Sonora, Hermosillo. A year later, the San Diego Padres hosted the Houston Astros at Estadio Fray Nano in Mexico City. Finally, in 2019, the Diamondbacks played once again the Rockies but, this time, at Estadio de Béisbol Monterrey in Monterrey. In 2020, MLB hosted a spring training game between the Minnesota Twins and the Detroit Tigers at Estadio Quisqueya in Santo Domingo.

Spring training locations by team

Generally, teams train in either Florida or Arizona based on their geographic location in North America, with eastern teams playing in Florida and western teams training in Arizona; the exceptions being the Cleveland Guardians, Cincinnati Reds, Milwaukee Brewers, and the two Chicago-based teams all training in Arizona; and the Houston Astros, Minnesota Twins and St. Louis Cardinals training in Florida. The last West Coast team to train in Florida was the Los Angeles Dodgers, who moved to Arizona in 2009.

Spring training teams can play colleges, minor league baseball clubs, intra-squad games (members of the same team play against each other), split-squad games (games when one team is scheduled for two games in one day, so the team splits into two squads and each squad plays in one of the games), and B Games (unofficial spring training games where statistics and standings are not counted). In years when the World Baseball Classic occurs, the national teams in the tournament prepare by playing major league teams. The players union will sometimes operate its own training facility if many free agents are unsigned by the start of spring training.

Grapefruit League

The origin of the name "Grapefruit League" has several versions. One popular myth was that Casey Stengel threw a grapefruit at Brooklyn Dodgers manager Wilbert Robinson. The accepted version is that aviator Ruth Law threw the grapefruit. In 1915, Law had been throwing golf balls from her airplane to advertise a golf course. Someone suggested throwing a baseball from her airplane. Robinson, whose team was in the Daytona Beach area for spring training, agreed to try to catch the baseball. When Robinson tried to catch it, the grapefruit exploded in his face, at first leading him to believe he had been seriously injured.

Grapefruit League teams primarily play against the others located on the same coast, rarely traveling to the other side of Florida for Spring Training games. The Astros, Cardinals, Marlins, Mets, and Nationals — all of whom play on the Atlantic Coast — play the majority of their games against each other, only playing three or four games against opponents located on the Gulf Coast.

Following is the list of spring training locations by team in the Grapefruit League in Florida:

Cactus League

Unlike the Grapefruit League, teams in the Cactus League often share stadiums; of the 15 teams who train in Arizona, only the Cubs, Angels, Brewers, Giants, and Athletics have their own home stadiums. The Cactus League teams are all within the Phoenix metropolitan area (as of 2014 when the Diamondbacks and Rockies left Tucson for their new shared facility, Salt River Fields at Talking Stick).

The newest stadium built for MLB spring training is Sloan Park, the spring training home for the Chicago Cubs in Mesa, Arizona, which opened in February 2014. The oldest stadium in Cactus League spring training is Tempe Diablo Stadium, built in 1969.

According to the Arizona Republic, the Cactus League generates more than $300 million a year in economic impact to the greater Phoenix metropolitan area economy. The Arizona Republic newspaper reports that more than $500 million has been spent on "building eight new stadiums and renovating two others for the 15 teams in the Valley."

Attendance set a new record at 2011 Cactus League games with 1.59 million attending games at the various stadiums in the Phoenix metro area. Much of the attendance surge is attributed to the Salt River Fields at Talking Stick venue that accounted for 22 percent of the Cactus League attendance.

Following is the list of spring training locations by team in the Cactus League in Arizona:

Statistics
Statistics are recorded during spring training games, but they are not combined with the listed statistics for regular season games, and unusual performances which would have broken records if accomplished during the regular season are considered to be unofficial.

For example, on March 14, 2000, the Red Sox used six pitchers to achieve a 5–0 perfect game victory over the Toronto Blue Jays. A perfect game is considered a crowning accomplishment during the regular season or postseason, but in spring training it attracts little notice. Starting pitcher Pedro Martínez, who lost a perfect game in extra innings in 1995 while pitching for the former Montreal Expos, was talking to reporters at the conclusion of the game, rather than watching the final pitches. Reliever Rod Beck, who finished the game, did not realize the nature of his accomplishment until informed by catcher Joe Siddall. Many fans also left before the game's conclusion.

Although spring training statistics are unofficial, teams frequently use players' spring training performances as a way of assigning starting roles and roster spots on the club.

Extended spring training

Minor league players participate in spring training following a telescoped schedule that generally lasts from March 1 to 31. At its conclusion, most players are assigned to farm team rosters to begin the minor league season. However, those players deemed unready for a full-season campaign—through inexperience or injury—are assigned to "extended spring training", a structured program of workouts, rehabilitation sessions, simulated games, and exhibition games based in the major league parent team's minor league training complex. If a player is later deemed ready to participate in full-season league action, he is promoted to an appropriate-level farm club. When short-season leagues (Rookie league, or previously Class A Short Season) begin play in late June, extended spring training players are assigned to those rosters, placed on the injured list, or released.

References

Further reading

External links

 Spring Training on MLB.com official website
 Grapefruit League official website
 Cactus League official website
 Cactus League History and Exhibition
 Cactus League Schedules, Stadium Info and Travel Info From Arizona Tourism

 

Annual sporting events in the United States
Annual events in Arizona
Annual events in Florida